NOS is an energy drink sold in  cans. The drink was also distributed in a bottle designed to look like a NOS (Nitrous Oxide Systems) tank but this bottle has been discontinued. Formerly a property of The Coca-Cola Company, it is currently produced by Monster Beverage and licensed by Holley Performance, which owns the trademark. NOS contains high levels of taurine and caffeine, and it also contains guarana. L-Theanine was removed as a "CMPLX6" ingredient in 2016, with inositol becoming listed as one of the six featured ingredients on the can. NOS Energy is currently available in Original, GT Grape, Nitro Mango, and Sonic Sour.

History
In February 2005, the Fuze Beverage company launched the beverage. The name "NOS" was licensed from Holley Performance Products, which manufactures the Nitrous Oxide Systems (NOS) brand of automotive nitrous injection systems. According to Holley, NOS is the first automotive product to have a consumable food product share its name and logo. In February 2007, Fuze was purchased by The Coca-Cola Company, which transferred the NOS licence to Coca-Cola. On June 12, 2015, Coca-Cola announced the transfer of its energy division, including NOS and Full Throttle, to Monster Beverage.

Team NOS
NOS has been involved in various forms of motorsports as its main source of advertising. Team NOS currently consists of NASCAR Cup Series driver Ricky Stenhouse Jr., Formula Drift driver Chris Forsberg, ARCA Menards Series driver Riley Herbst, Ultimate Drift Brasil driver Erick Medici and YouTuber TJ Hunt

NASCAR driver Kyle Busch and off-road driver Brian Deegan are former members of Team NOS. Busch became a NOS Energy driver in 2008 when he first joined Joe Gibbs Racing. He has raced the No. 18 NOS Energy Toyota Camry to victory lane a record number of times in the Xfinity Series, where he is the all-time leader in race wins, initially from 2008 until 2011, when he switched to then-rival Monster Energy in 2012, around the same time NOS parent Coca-Cola was exploring a sale of its energy drink brands.  Following Monster's acquisition of Coca-Cola's energy beverage products, and a corporate decision to realign the Busch Brothers, both of whom are affiliated with Monster Beverage, Kyle was aligned with NOS Energy in 2016. In the fall of 2016, Monster Beverage released its newest flavor "NOS Rowdy" which was inspired by Busch and his nickname "Rowdy". The sponsorship ended after the 2018 season.

In 2019, NOS became the title sponsor of the World of Outlaws Sprint Car Series, replacing Craftsman Tools. NOS is also the primary sponsor of World of Outlaws NOS Energy Drink Sprint Cars Series driver, Sheldon Haudenschild.

After 2019, Busch left the NOS Brand to form his own energy drink company, Rowdy Energy, in the meantime NOS went onto sponsor Ricky Stenhouse Jr. starting in 2020 with select races on the 47 car. Previously from 2012 to 2015 during the time Busch was sponsored by Monster, NOS sponsored Stenhouse Jr. during his 2012 Nationwide Series championship year and moved on with him to the Cup Series for the next three years on the 17 Ford for Roush Fenway Racing. As of 2022, NOS sponsors Stenhouse and the 47 team.

Ingredients
Ingredients are carbonated water, high fructose corn syrup, citric acid, sodium citrate, sodium hexametaphosphate (preservative), caffeine, taurine, natural flavors, acacia, potassium sorbate (preservative), glycerol ester of rosin, inositol, sucralose, yellow 5, calcium disodium edta (preservative), pyridoxine hydrochloride (vitamin B6), yellow 6, guarana, cyanocobalamin (vitamin B12)

References

External links

Energy drinks
Food and drink introduced in 2004